Valentina Vladimirovna Cherkasova  (born June 22, 1958) is a  Soviet sport shooter. She won the Bronze medal in the 50 m rifle 3 pos in the 1988 Summer Olympics in Seoul.

She was born in Jõhvi. In 1981 she graduated from a sport school in Moscow.

She began her shooting career in 1971 in Narva, coached by Vladimir Sidorov. In 1988 Summer Olympics in Soul, she won bronze medal. In 1992 Summer Olympics in Barcelona she finished 5th. She is 3-times Estonian champion. 1975–1977 she was a member of Estonian national shooting team. She was also a member of Soviet Union national shooting team.

Since about late-1970s she is living in Russia.

References

1958 births
Soviet female sport shooters
ISSF rifle shooters
Shooters at the 1988 Summer Olympics
Shooters at the 1992 Summer Olympics
Olympic bronze medalists for the Soviet Union
Olympic medalists in shooting
Living people
Olympic shooters of the Soviet Union
Olympic shooters of the Unified Team
Honoured Masters of Sport of the USSR
Medalists at the 1988 Summer Olympics
People from Jõhvi